Bjørn John Johansen (23 May 1940 – 6 May 2002) was a Norwegian jazz musician (baritone, tenor & alto saxophones, clarinet and flute), known from a number of recordings and international cooperation. He has been one of the most influential Norwegian saxophonists of all time and has been the inspiration for a generations of musicians, among them Jan Garbarek.

Career 
Johansen was born in Fredrikstad, Norway.  Strongly influenced by the music of John Coltrane, he joined orchestras led by Gunnar Brostigen, Kjell Karlsen (1956–59), Lars Sandsgaard, Pete Brown, and Arild Wikstrøm (1961). In addition to playing with Karin Krog, Bernt Rosengren, George Gruntz, Frode Thingnæs, Egil Kapstad, Helge Hurum/Thorleif Østereng/«Radiostorbandet» (1966–90), EBU Big Band (73), Laila Dalseth, Bjørn Alterhaug, and within the «Fatah Morgana Quartet».

He was sentral on the Norwegian jazzscenes within bands like his own Kapstad/Johansen Quartet, including Bjørn Alterhaug (bass) and Ole Jacob Hansen (drums), releasing the album Friends (1980), and Bjørn Johansen Quartet, including Carl Morten Iversen (bass), Ole Jacob Hansen (drums) and Erling Aksdal (piano), releasing Dear Henrik (1984). Johansen also released the  album Take one featuring Cedar Walton (1987), that was awarded Spellemannprisen 1987. His compositions are published by Norsk Jazzforlag (2004).

He died, aged 61, in Oslo.

Honors 
Buddyprisen 1962
«Statens arbeidsstipend» 1981
Spellemannprisen 1987 in the class Jazz, for the album Take one
Gammleng-prisen 1997 in the class Jazz

Discography

Soloalbums 
1986: Dear Henrik (Gemini Music)
1987: Take One (Odin Records), feat. Cedar Walton Trio
1990: Some Other Time, with Laila Dalseth, Bjørn Alterhaug, Egil Kapstad & Frode Thingnæs
2001: Portrait of a Norwegian Jazz Artist (Gemini Records)

Collaborative works 
Within «Public Enemies»
1965: Elevate Me
1966: From Public Enemies Without Love
1966: Sunny, feat. Karin Krog

With Egil Kapstad
1968: Syner (Norsk Jazzforum), with Choir & Orchestra
1979: Til jorden (Pan Records 2005), feat. the poet Rolf Jacobsen
1980: Friends (Hot Club Records), within Kapstad/Johansen Quartet
1994: Remembrance, within Egil Kapstad Trio

Within «Blix Band»
1997: På en lyserød sky
1999: Texas

With other projects
1963: Metropol Jazz: Jazz Sounds From Norway
1967: Rosemalt Sound, with Alf Cranner
1974: Syng, klapp & swing - Grammofonplate med barn og Harald Gundhus (Dyklestiker Grannofon 2005)
1976: Peacemaker (Gemini Records 2003), with Per Husby Septett
1980: Hva er det de vil? Live fra ABC-Teateret, with Odd Børretzen & Alf Cranner
1980: Jargong vålereng''', with Rolf Søder
1983: Norsk Jazz 1960-19801984: Epilog1986: The Norwegian Radio Big Band meets Bob Florence (Odin Records), with Bob Florence
1988: The Jazz Sampler1988: Alfred Janson1989: The Odin Sampler - Jazz out of Norway1990: Jazzpoem, Vol. 1, with Ola Calmeyer
1991: The Jazz Sampler Vol. 21991: Constellations (Odin Records), with Bjørn Alterhaug
1993: Norske bilder - Sounds and Visions of Norway1993: Med lyset på, within  «Norsk Utflukt»
1996: Close Erase, within «Close Erase»
1996:: Mr. Swingstang, within «Mr. Swingstang»
1996: I livd av blå syrin, within «Busserullen»
1997: Rett opp fra elva, within «Sagene Ring»
1997: Andre bilder Vigleik Storaas Trio
1998: Odd Børretzens mest ålreite (Bare Bra Musikk)
1998: Imagic, with Niels Præstholm & «Embla Nordic Project»
1999: Oslo Jazz Circle 50 år - Jubileumskonsert 1998 - Vol. 22000:: One of a Kind, with Laila Dalseth
2001: Cool, Kløver & Dixie - Jazz in Norway Vol. 32003: Bjørn Johansen in Memoriam (Hot Club Records)
2003: Turning Pages - Jazz in Norway vol. 42003: 50 beste fra 40 år, with Alf Cranner
2005: Jazz Collection 12007: Spectre: The Unreleased Works 1971-1982 (Plastic Strip), with Helge Hurum
2008: Unreleased Works 1969-1979 (Plastic Strip), with Christian Reim
2010: Our Buddy'', with Ola Calmeyer

References

External links 
Bjørn Johansen Biografi on Norsk Musikkinformasjon
Bjørn Johansen Pictures on Norsk jazzarkiv
Poncajazz Records
Bjørn John Johansen on Store Norske Leksikon

1940 births
2002 deaths
Musicians from Fredrikstad
Avant-garde jazz musicians
Spellemannprisen winners
Norwegian jazz saxophonists
Gemini Records artists
20th-century saxophonists